Mayra Alejandra Rodríguez Lezama (May 7, 1958 – April 17, 2014) was a Venezuelan actress. She was the daughter of the Comedian, Charles Barry and the Writer and Actress, Ligia Lezama.

Biography 
Mayra Alejandra Rodríguez Lezama was born on May 7, 1958 in Caracas, Venezuela. She was the daughter of Charles Barry (born Carlos Alberto Rodríguez González), was a humourist and founding member of the long-standing Radio Rochela comedy show, while her mother, Ligia Lezama, was a teleplay writer and also an able actress. She had one brother and one sister. She was raised in a home of artists and was for sure bound to have some of the same passions.

Career 
For most of her career, a Mayra character coped with the unfortunate turn of events that were inevitable in TV melodramas and movies by conveying a tense or worried expression. Her fits of tears or temperament were short and sweet, and it underscored the projected inner strength of her characters that proved a pictorial sense of feminism. Her technique was  spontaneous and effective, but her acting genius and rhetoric relied on her expressive eyes and the graceful stylings of her hands.

After attending high school, Mayra made her debut in the Radio Caracas Television telenovela Valentina (1975). Then, her first starring role was in Angélica (1976), where she played a character created especially designed for her by her mother Ligia Lezama. Later, the young actress excelled in La hija de Juana Crespo (1977), an effective drama from Salvador Garmendia and José Ignacio Cabrujas.

Mayra next appeared in another hit, Luisana Mia (1981), but she is best remembered for her strong performance in Leonela (1983), where she played the role of a rape victim falling in love with her rapist. She also appeared in sympathetic parts in Bienvenida Esperanza (1983), Marta y Javier (1983) and La Mujer Prohibida (1991).

Nevertheless, Mayra only needed two films to create a perennial image of femme fatale inside Venezuelan cinema.

In 1978 she portrayed the ill-fated Carmen  of Prosper Mérimée, as sensual as unprejudiced, dragged itself to tragedy, in Román Chalbaud's adaptation Carmen la que contaba 16 años.

Eight years later she repeated her success as a troubled woman, but perhaps more fragile, more lover and friendly that Carmen, while characterizing the seductive and promiscuous Manon Lescaut of Abbé Prévost. In Manón, a reasonably faithful adaptation made by Chalbaud, Mayra projected an unforced dignity that bolstered her image and established herself as a reliable actress.

Eventually, she appeared in a bunch of TV series and  stage.

In the 1990s, she took this time at the height of her popularity to go on sabbatical to take care of her child. Motherhood was part of her public image, and her own children frequently was featured in fan magazine articles and photographs.

Still beautiful at 45, Mayra went back to work in 2000, appearing as a guest star in the Venevisión telenovela Hechizo de Amor. In her later collaborations, she had become typed as a mother, usually playing the parent of grown-up children, appearing as characters that were older than herself, thus acquiring an older image that belied her actual age. Adapting to her new support role, she made significant appearances in Estrambótica Anastasia (2004)  and Harina de otro costal (2010), a contemporary and correct version of Shakespeare's Romeo and Juliet.

During her career, Mayra starred alongside leading men as Miguelángel Landa, both in television and films, as well as with Carlos Olivier, José Luis Rodríguez and Jean Carlo Simancas.

She belongs to the generation of pioneering actresses of Venezuelan soap operas such as Doris Wells, Marina Baura, Lupita Ferrer, Caridad Canelón, Hilda Carrero, Rebeca González, Pierina España and Amanda Gutiérrez

Personal life 
Mayra Alejandra was married twice and divorced.

Mayra Alejandra had a steamy relationship with Mexican actor Salvador Pineda. They were going to get married on December 18, 1987, but the Mexican actor left her at the altar. On March 27, 1989, she gave birth to the couple's first child, a boy, whom they called Aarón Salvador Pineda Rodríguez, who was born in Caracas, Venezuela. Salvador Pineda recognized his son, Aarón Salvador Pineda Rodríguez on the advice of his friend Andrés García.

In 2012, Mayra Alejandra announced that she had been diagnosed with lung cancer. She subsequently received chemotherapy treatment, being able to regain a level of normalcy in her life. She suffered a relapse in early 2014. She died in Caracas on April 17, 2014 at the age of 55 after a long illness from a lung cancer.

Filmography

Television

Movies

Sources

1955 births
2014 deaths
Actresses from Caracas
Venezuelan film actresses
Venezuelan telenovela actresses
Venezuelan television actresses
Venezuelan stage actresses
20th-century Venezuelan actresses
21st-century Venezuelan actresses
Deaths from cancer in Venezuela
Deaths from lung cancer